Ben Simons may refer to:
Ben Simons (bobsleigh) (born 1986), British bobsleigher and former athlete
Ben Simons (politician) (born 2000), American politician

See also
Benjamin Simons, British theoretical physicist
Ben Simmons (born 1996), Australian basketball player